Niño is a 2014 Philippine television drama series broadcast by GMA Network. Directed by Maryo J. de los Reyes, it stars Miguel Tanfelix in the title role and David Remo. It premiered on May 26, 2014, on the network's Telebabad line up replacing Carmela: Ang Pinakamagandang Babae sa Mundong Ibabaw. The series concluded on September 12, 2014, with a total of 80 episodes. It was replaced by Strawberry Lane in its timeslot.

The series is streaming online on YouTube.

Premise
Niño, who will be adopted and raised by Leny and David after being separated from his parents due to an accident, will become a source of inspiration and hope to the people in Barrio Pag-asa. While Tukayo will help and guide Niño in overcoming different circumstances.

Cast and characters

Lead cast
 Miguel Tanfelix as Niño Innocente / Miguel Sagrado Ibarra
 David Remo as Tukayo Maki / Sto. Niño

Supporting cast
 Gloria Romero as Violeta
 Dante Rivero as Pedro Sagrado
 Angelu de Leon as Leny Innocente
 Jay Manalo as Lucio
 Katrina Halili as Hannah Sagrado-Ibarra
 Neil Ryan Sese as David Innocente
 Luz Valdez as Josefa "Epang" Innocente
 Ces Quesada as Danita Delos Santos
 Renz Valerio as Raphael Sagrado Ibarra
 Bianca Umali as Angelica "Gracie"
 Sandy Talag as Tiny Delos Santos
 Julian Marcus Trono as Cocoy
 Vincent Magbanua as Matmat
 German Moreno as Pete

Recurring cast
 Jerald Napoles as Obet
 Angeli Bayani as Helen
 Rafa Siguion-Reyna as Ric
 Annika Camaya as Charito
 Stephanie Sol as Magda

Guest cast
 Tom Rodriguez as Gabriel Ibarra
 Lito Legaspi as Manuel Reyes
 Bettina Carlos as Heidi
 Gian Magdangal as Juanito 
 Isabelle Daza as Claire
 Jestoni Alarcon as Henry
 Mickey Ferriols as Cathy
 Barbara Miguel as Calay
 Sherilyn Reyes as Cynthia
 Lara Melissa De Leon as Perla
 Will Ashley De Leon as young Niño
 Elijah Alejo as young Gracie
 Flora Gasser as Ason
 Nicole Dulalia as Patty
 Andrea Del Rosario as Olivia

Ratings
According to AGB Nielsen Philippines' Mega Manila household television ratings, the pilot episode of Nino earned a 21.2% rating. While the final episode scored a 29.6% rating. The series had its highest rating on September 8, 2014, with a 30.4% rating.

Accolades

References

External links
 
 

2014 Philippine television series debuts
2014 Philippine television series endings
Filipino-language television shows
GMA Network drama series
Television shows set in Manila